Georgios Banikas (19 May 1888 – 9 April 1956) was a Greek athlete. He competed in the men's pole vault at the 1908 Summer Olympics and the 1912 Summer Olympics.

References

1888 births
1956 deaths
Athletes (track and field) at the 1906 Intercalated Games
Athletes (track and field) at the 1908 Summer Olympics
Athletes (track and field) at the 1912 Summer Olympics
Greek male pole vaulters
Olympic athletes of Greece
Place of birth missing
Athletes from Athens
20th-century Greek people